Ben Stephens (born 9 August 1997) is an English footballer who plays for National League North club King's Lynn Town, as a forward.

Career

Early career
Stephens played youth football for Leicester City, and in non-league football with Oadby Town and Kettering Town.

Stratford Town
Stephens signed for Kettering's Southern League Premier Division rivals Stratford Town in November 2016, and made his debut for the club on 22 November 2016, in a league match at home to Slough Town, appearing as a substitute in a 2–1 defeat.

He scored his first goal for Stratford Town on 3 December 2016, in a league match away at Banbury United, with the club losing 2–1.

During his time at the club, Stephens trialled with a number of league clubs, including Coventry City, Ipswich Town and Birmingham City.

Macclesfield Town
In May 2018 he spent time with the V9 Academy, before turning professional in June 2018 after signing for Macclesfield Town.

Ben made his EFL League Two debut for Macclesfield Town on 12 October 2018, in an away fixture against Tranmere Rovers, coming on as 86th minute substitute for Tyrone Marsh. Tranmere won the game 1–0. Stephens scored his first goal in the EFL League Two on 3 November 2018, in a 4–1 defeat at home to Bury.

Stephens was released by Macclesfield at the end of the 2019–20 season. He re-signed for the club on 15 September 2020. A day later he was released by the club following their winding up at the High Court.

Kettering Town
He returned to Kettering Town in October 2020.

Stratford Town
Stephens made his return to Stratford Town on 23 July 2021.

Barwell
Stephens signed for Southern League Premier Central rivals Barwell in August 2021. He made his debut for Barwell on 14 August 2021, in an away fixture against Lowestoft Town, scoring 2 goals in a 3–0 victory.

Stephens finished the season making 33 appearances in the Southern League Premier Central, and scoring 24 goals, which actually made the player the top goalscorer in the league for the 2021–22 season.

King's Lynn Town
Following Stephens' impressive 2021–22 season, he made the step up to join National League North club King's Lynn Town in July 2022 following a successful trial.

Career statistics

References

External links
 
 

1997 births
Living people
English footballers
Association football forwards
Leicester City F.C. players
Oadby Town F.C. players
Kettering Town F.C. players
Stratford Town F.C. players
Macclesfield Town F.C. players
Barwell F.C. players
V9 Academy players
King's Lynn Town F.C. players
English Football League players
Southern Football League players
National League (English football) players